Svitlana Viktorivna Akhadova (Світлана Вікторівна Ахадова; born 10 May 1993) is a Ukrainian canoeist. She represented her country at the 2016 Summer Olympics.

References 

1993 births
Living people
Ukrainian female canoeists
Canoeists at the 2016 Summer Olympics
Olympic canoeists of Ukraine
21st-century Ukrainian women